"Do I Love You" is a song co-written and recorded by Paul Anka, from his 1972 eponymous LP. Released as an advance single in late 1971, "Do I Love You" reached number 14 on the Easy Listening Singles charts of both the U.S. and Canada, number 16 on the Canadian Pop chart, and was a modest hit on the U.S. Hot 100 as well.  As with the earlier "My Way", it was adapted from a French-language song ("Plus rien qu'une adresse en commun") popularized by Claude François, and Anka composed the English lyrics.

Donna Fargo cover
"Do I Love You (Yes in Every Way)" was covered by American country music artist Donna Fargo and released as the second single from her album Shame on Me in December 1977. The song peaked at number 2 on the Billboard Hot Country Singles chart. It also reached number 1 on the RPM Country Tracks chart in Canada.

Chart performance
Paul Anka

Donna Fargo

Later versions
 Engelbert Humperdinck recorded it for his 1973 album "King Of Hearts".
 Anka himself recorded a number of versions. In 2012, he re-recorded the song as a duet with Dolly Parton for his album Duets. He also recorded the song with his daughter, Anthea. She recorded a Spanish version as well.

References

External links
 

1971 songs
1971 singles
1977 singles
Donna Fargo songs
Paul Anka songs
Warner Records singles
Buddah Records singles
Songs written by Paul Anka